Portrait of Margaret van Eyck (or Margaret, the Artist's Wife) is a 1439 oil on wood painting by the Early Netherlandish master Jan van Eyck. It is one of the two latest of his surviving paintings, and one of the earliest European artworks to depict a painter's spouse. Completed when she was around 34, it was hung until the early 18th century in the Bruges chapel of the Guild of painters. The work is thought to be a pendant or diptych panel for either a now lost self-portrait known from records until 1769, or of Jan van Eyck's likely self-portrait now in the National Gallery in London.

Description
Margaret is shown in three-quarter view, that is her body almost directly facing the viewer but not quite. She is set against a flat black and featureless background, wearing an elegant red woolen gown with grey fur lining (in the medieval period fur often represented female sexuality), probably from squirrel, in the neck and cuffs. Her horned wimple is decorated with fine lace. Her left eye shows evidence of a squint, a feature unusually evident in northern Europeans of the era. The painter has taken a number of liberties with representation to accentuate the features of his wife. Her head is out of proportion to her body, and her forehead unusually and fashionably high, a device which allows the artist to concentrate on the facial features of his wife. In addition, the geometric pattern formed by her head-dress, arms and the V of her neck-line allows her face to dominate the image.

Van Eyck died within two years of this work. He inscribed plates on the top and ends of the frame in Greek lettering with the words, My husband Johannes completed me in the year 1439 on 17 June, at the age of 33. As I can. "As I can" (ALS ICH KAN) was something of a personal motto and motif for van Eyck, as well as a pun on his surname. It can be found inscribed on several of his religious paintings, though on only two portraits.

Background
The reason for the inception of the painting is unknown; but that it was created for private rather than public viewing can be inferred from the sitter's unidealised representation and her direct but plaintive gaze towards the viewer, which creates an intimate and informal atmosphere. The painting was probably created to mark an occasion; maybe to commemorate the couple's anniversary, or her birthday, or as a gift to her.

The couple likely married around 1432–33, soon after his move to Bruges - she is unmentioned before he relocated while the first of their two children was born in 1434. Very little is known of Margaret, even her maiden name is lost - contemporary records refer to her mainly as Damoiselle Marguierite. She is thought to have been of aristocratic birth (1405), though from the lower nobility, evidenced from her clothes in this portrait which are fashion but not of the sumptuousness worn by the bride in van Eyck's Arnolfini Portrait. The fabrics and colours worn by people of the 15th century were informally regulated by their social position; for example black, an expensive dye, could only be worn by the upper reaches of society. As the widow of a renowned painter, Margaret was afforded a modest pension by the city of Bruges after Jan's death. It is recorded that at least some of this income was invested in lottery.

Attribution
Although the Early Netherlandish painters are highly regarded today, they were almost forgotten by the early 1800s. This work was not rediscovered until the late 18th century when it was found for sale in a Belgian fish market, although accounts differ. As with most of the rediscovered works of its era, it underwent a number of attributions before a broad consensus on its origin was formed. The portrait is still in its original frame and is in very good condition with the colours and paint well preserved. It was cleaned and restored by the National Gallery, London in 1998.

Many early collectors and later art historians speculated that it might have once formed half of a diptych. It was paired as a pendant for a time with a self-portrait by van Eyck when two of his works were acquired by the chapel of the Guild of Saint Luke before 1769. Some critics, when supporting the theory of a diptych, mention a now-lost male portrait known to be similar to his National Gallery, London Portrait of a Man. A third painting is suspected, but not known, to be a portrait of Margaret: the 1436 Lucca Madonna. However, art historian Max Friedlænder warned against assumptions based on facial resemblance, believing that artists of the time may have projected the likeness of the women in their lives onto female subjects in their religious work.

References

Notes

Sources
 Borchert, Till-Holger. "Margaret van Eyck", in Van Eyck to Durer. London: Thames & Hudson, 2011. 
 Campbell, Lorne. The Fifteenth-Century Netherlandish Paintings. London, National Gallery. New Haven: Yale University Press, 1998. 
 Harbison, Craig. Jan van Eyck: The Play of Realism. Reaktion Books, 1997. 
 Benton, Janetta Rebold. "Materials, Methods, and Masterpieces of Medieval Art". Praeger, 2009. 
 Smith, Jeffrey Chipps. The Northern Renaissance. London: Phaidon Press, 2004. 
 Van Der Elst, Joseph. The Last Flowering of the Middle Ages. Kessinger Publishing, 2005. 
 Van Buren, Anne H. Illuminating Fashion: Dress in the Art of Medieval France and the Netherlands, 1325-1515. New York: Morgan Library & Museum, 2011. 

1430s paintings
Portraits by Jan van Eyck
Portraits of women